Chryseobacterium taeanense  is a Gram-negative bacteria from the genus of Chryseobacterium which has been isolated from the roots of the plant Elymus mollis near Tae-an in Korea.

References

Further reading

External links
Type strain of Chryseobacterium taeanense at BacDive -  the Bacterial Diversity Metadatabase

taeanense
Bacteria described in 2006